Vagner Gonçalves Nogueira de Souza (born 27 April 1996), commonly known as Vagner Gonçalves, is a Brazilian professional footballer who plays as a winger for Dinamo Tbilisi. He also holds French citizenship.

Career

Kryvbas Kryvyi Rih
In summer 2021 he moved on loan to Kryvbas Kryvyi Rih in Ukrainian First League.

Dila Gori
In January 2022 he moved to Dila Gori in Erovnuli Liga.

Shkëndija
In summer 2022, he moved to Macedonian First Football League club Shkëndija.

Career statistics

Club

Notes

Honours
Saburtalo Tbilisi
 Erovnuli Liga: 2018
 Georgian Cup: 2019

Cercle Brugge
 Belgian Second Division: 2017–18

References

1996 births
Living people
Brazilian footballers
French footballers
Footballers from Porto Alegre
Association football midfielders
Challenger Pro League players
Ukrainian Premier League players
Ukrainian First League players
Macedonian First Football League players
SC Bastia players
FC Saburtalo Tbilisi players
Cercle Brugge K.S.V. players
FC Dinamo Batumi players
SC Dnipro-1 players
FC Kryvbas Kryvyi Rih players
FC Dila Gori players
KF Shkëndija players
FC Dinamo Tbilisi players
Brazilian expatriate footballers
Brazilian expatriate sportspeople in Belgium
Expatriate footballers in Belgium
Expatriate footballers in Georgia (country)
Brazilian expatriate sportspeople in Ukraine
Expatriate footballers in Ukraine
Brazilian expatriate sportspeople in North Macedonia
Expatriate footballers in North Macedonia